The Bangi–Tetela languages are a proposed intermediate clade of Bantu languages that comprise a large part of Guthrie's Zone C (Motingea 1996):

Bangi–Ntomba (Lingala, Mongo, etc.: mostly C.30)
Soko–Kele (C50–60)
Tetela (C70)
Bushoong (C80)

Footnotes